Thomas Edwin Ross (11 May 1873 – 19 January 1951) was a Progressive party member of the House of Commons of Canada. He was born in Oro, Ontario and became a farmer.

He was elected to Parliament at the Simcoe North riding in the 1921 general election. After completing his only federal term, the 14th Canadian Parliament, Ross left the House of Commons and did not seek another term in the 1925 federal election.

External links
 

1873 births
1951 deaths
Canadian farmers
Members of the House of Commons of Canada from Ontario
Progressive Party of Canada MPs